Angus Scrimm (born Lawrence Rory Guy; August 19, 1926 – January 9, 2016) was an American actor, author, and journalist, known for his portrayal of the Tall Man in the 1979 horror film Phantasm and its sequels.

Early life
Scrimm was born in Kansas City, Kansas to Alfred David and Pearl Guy. Scrimm graduated from the University of Southern California, where he majored in drama.

He was originally a journalist and wrote and edited for TV Guide, Cinema Magazine, the Los Angeles Herald Examiner and many other publications. He also worked for Capitol Records, writing liner notes for many LPs and CDs for artists ranging from Frank Sinatra to the Beatles, as well as Arthur Rubinstein and Itzhak Perlman. Scrimm won a Grammy (credited as Rory Guy, as were his early film roles) for his liner notes to the 1974 album Korngold: The Classic Erich Wolfgang Korngold.

Career
Scrimm had several minor supporting roles in the early 1970s before being cast as the Tall Man, the chief villain in Don Coscarelli's independent horror film Phantasm (1979). To appear even taller when playing the Tall Man, he wore suits that were several sizes too small and platform shoes. His Phantasm role led to a steady acting career in theater and television. Scrimm had a recurring role as an SD-6 agent on Alias.

Death
On January 9, 2016, Scrimm died of prostate cancer at the age of 89 in Tarzana, Los Angeles, California.

Filmography

References

External links

 
 
 The Phantasm Archives Unpublished Interview from 1992
 Phantasm website
 PHANTASMAGORIA
 Totalscifionline.com
 

1926 births
2016 deaths
American male film actors
American male journalists
American male television actors
American male voice actors
Grammy Award winners
Writers from Kansas City, Kansas
Male actors from Kansas City, Kansas
Writers from California
Male actors from California
20th-century American male actors
21st-century American male actors
University of Southern California alumni
Deaths from prostate cancer
Deaths from cancer in California